The following is a list of Kennesaw State Owls men's basketball seasons. The Owls compete in the Atlantic Sun Conference at the NCAA Division I level. They play their home games at the KSU Convocation Center. Kennesaw State became a Division I member in 2005, and won the Division II national championship in 2004.

Seasons

Statistics
Statistics correct as of the end of the 2022–23 NCAA Division I men's basketball season

References

 
Kennesaw State
Kennesaw State Owls basketball seasons